An emotional expression is a behavior that communicates an emotional state or attitude. It can be verbal or nonverbal, and can occur with or without self-awareness. Emotional expressions include facial movements like smiling or scowling, simple behaviors like crying, laughing, or saying "thank you," and more complex behaviors like writing a letter or giving a gift. Individuals have some conscious control of their emotional expressions; however, they need not have conscious awareness of their emotional or affective state in order to express emotion.

Researchers in psychology have proposed many different and often competing theoretical models to explain emotions and emotional expression, going as far back as Charles Darwin's discussion of emotion as an evolved capacity. Though there is no universally accepted theory of emotion, theorists in emotion agree that experience of emotions and expression of them in a variety of ways, such as with voices, faces, and bodies, is key to human communication. The cultural norms and beliefs of a society also affect and shape the emotional expressions of its members, and expressions appropriate and important in one culture may be taboo in another.

Evidence shows that gay partners have higher levels of expressiveness than heterosexual partners. High expressiveness could be useful in constructively resolving relationship-related conflict.

Models of emotion
There are many different theories about the nature of emotion and the way that it is represented in the brain and body. Of the elements that distinguish between the theories of emotion, perhaps the most salient is differing perspectives on emotional expression. 

Some theories about emotion consider emotions to be biologically basic and stable across people and cultures. These are often called "basic emotion" perspectives because they view emotion as biologically basic.  From this perspective, an individual's emotional expressions are sufficient to determine a person's internal, emotional state. If a person is smiling, they are happy. If a person is crying, they are sad. Each emotion has a consistent and specific pattern of expressions, and that pattern of responses is only expressed during that emotion and not during other emotions. Facial emotional expressions are particularly salient stimuli for transferring important nonverbal signals to others. For that reason, emotional expressions are the best direct indicators of affective attitudes and dispositions. There is growing evidence that brain regions generally engaged in the processing of emotional information are also activated during the processing of facial emotions.

Some theories of emotion take the stance that emotional expression is more flexible, and that there is a cognitive component to emotion.  These theories account for the malleability in emotion by proposing that humans appraise situations and, depending on the result of their appraisal, different emotions and the corresponding expressions of emotion are triggered.  The tendency to appraise certain situations as one emotion or another can vary by person and culture; however, appraisal models still maintain that there are basic responses that are specific and consistent to each emotion that humans feel.

Other theories of emotion propose that emotions are constructed based upon the person, situation, culture, and past experiences, and that there are no preset emotional responses that are consistent and specific to one emotion or another.

Basic model
The basic model of emotions finds its roots in Charles Darwin's The Expression of Emotions in Man and Animals. Darwin claimed that the expression of emotions involves many systems: facial expression, behavioral response, and physical responses, which include physiological, postural, and vocal changes. Most importantly, Darwin claimed that emotional expression was consistent with his theories on evolution and thus, the expression of emotion is universal and should therefore be expressed similarly across race or culture. This is known as the universality hypothesis. Lastly, primates and animals exhibit precursors of muscle actions of the facial expressions of humans.

Many researchers have expanded on Darwin's original theories on emotional expression. Paul Ekman and Carroll Izard were the first to test Darwin's theory. These psychologists, through cross-cultural empirical tests found that there were a number of basic emotions that were universally recognized. Later studies suggested that facial expressions are unique to each emotion and are signals that convey information of one's internal state, and this information is used to coordinate social interactions. Overall, the basic emotion perspective assumes that emotions are unique events that occur as a result of special mechanisms, and each emotion has its own respective specific brain circuit. Moreover, the expression of each emotion has its own respective response, manifestation in face, voice, and body. 

The basic emotion view brought Ekman to create the Facial Action Coding System (FACS) and Facial Expression Awareness Compassion Emotions (FACE). FACS is a database of compiled facial expressions, wherein each facial movement is termed an action unit (AU). FACE explains how to become keen at observing emotion in the faces of others. It consists of the Micro Expression Training Tool (METT), which trains individuals to disambiguate between emotional expressions through recognizing distinct facial expressions that are unique to each emotion. The second part of this training program trains individuals to read microexpressions; a face elicits an emotion very quickly and the individual is prompted to report which emotion was seen. The Subtle Expression Training Tool (SETT) trains individuals to be able to recognize the subtle changes in a person's facial expression due to slight changes in emotional experiences. These subtle expressions can occur at the onset of emotions, or when an individual is actively suppressing the emotion.

Appraisal model

Appraisal models of emotion state that emotions are triggered by mental states that are truly unique in both form and function. Appraisal models are similar to the basic model of emotion in that both views consider that, once an emotion is triggered, emotional expressions are biologically predetermined and are displayed only in one emotion and every time that emotion is expressed.  The main difference between basic emotion models and appraisal models is that appraisal models assume that there is a cognitive antecedent that determines which emotion is triggered. Traditional appraisal theories consider appraisals to be universal and like a set of switches that can be turned on by biological and environmental triggers. When a person makes an appraisal, an individual will react with an appropriate, emotional response that can include an external, emotional expression. More recent appraisal models account for variation in emotional expression by suggesting that cognitive appraisals are more like themes that can be triggered by a number of different actions and situations. Emotional expressions arise from these appraisals, which essentially describe the context of the situation. One appraisal model has developed the law of situational meaning, which states that emotions tend to be evoked by certain kinds of events. For example, grief is elicited by personal loss. In this case, personal loss would be the appraisal and one can express grief through emotional expressions.

Psychological construction model
Another model of emotion, called psychological construction, describes emotion as a construction that results from more basic psychological processes. In a psychological construction model, basic psychological processes like affect (positive or negative feeling combined with some degree of physiological activation), previous experiences, language, and executive functioning combine to form a discrete emotion experience. While some discrete emotions tend to have typical responses (e.g. crying when sad, laughing when happy), a psychological construction model can account for the wide variability in emotional expression (e.g. crying when extremely happy; laughing when uncomfortable). 

Psychological construction models call into question the assumption that there are basic, discrete emotion expressions that are universally recognized. Many basic emotion studies use highly posed, stereotypical facial expressions as emotional signals such as a pout, which would indicate one is feeling sad. These facial expressions can be better understood as symbols of emotion rather than signals. While these symbols have undeniable emotional meaning and are consistently observed during day-day emotional behavior, they do not have a 1-to-1 relationship a person's internal mental or emotional state. For example, not everyone furrows their brow when they are feeling angry. Moreover, these emotional symbols are not universal due to cultural differences. For example, when Western individuals are asked to identify an emotional expression on a specific face, in an experimental task, they focus on the target's facial expression. Japanese individuals use the information of the surrounding faces to determine the emotional state of the target face. This challenges experiments that solely use a presentation of an isolated emotional expression in experiments because it is reflecting just a Western notion of emotion.

Social construction model
Social construction models generally say that there is no biological circuitry for emotions since emotions are solely based on experience and context. Some even suggest that certain emotions can only exist in the reciprocal exchanges of a social encounter. Since there are unique local languages and local moral orders, cultures can use the same emotion and expression in very different ways. Thus, emotional expressions are culturally-prescribed performances rather than internal mental events. Knowing a social script for a certain emotion allows one to enact the emotional behaviors that are appropriate for the cultural context. Emotional expressions serve a social function and are essentially a way of reaching out to the world.

Emotion regulation 

Various researchers have highlighted the importance for an individual of being able to successfully regulate emotions.  Ways of doing this include cognitive reappraisal (interpreting a situation in positive terms) and expressive suppression (masking signs of inner emotional states). Emotions are evident through facial expressions. Humans can express their own emotions and understand others as well. Humans can quickly identify happy expressions whereas the disgust expression takes longer to identify.

Emotional intelligence

Theorists such as Gardner and Sternberg have each presented different definitions and categories of intelligence. Richard Gunderman refers to emotional intelligence as a type of intelligence, in addition to the commonly used definition. He has defined it as "the ability to understand and respond to emotions in daily life". For instance, a person who does not face his or her emotions and tackle them may be constantly frustrated. This person will face troubles moving on with his or her life. Consequently, emotionally intelligent individuals are better at expressing and identifying their emotions and those of the people around them. Those who are adept at handling their emotions tend to live an easier life than those who are not. Since people with better emotional intelligence are sensitive to emotions, they are considered better team players and are family-oriented.

Some researchers argue that emotional intelligence is biological, while others say it is innate. Gunderman states that emotional intelligence is a learned and an instinctual skill. According to him, it can be cultivated through three means: learning more about it, drawing attention to it for oneself and others, and reading the works of authors he considers to be emotionally intelligent, such as Jane Austen and Leo Tolstoy. Through engaging in emotional expressions and regulation, it is contemplated more than before and brings forth considerable changes in life and attitude. Sy and Cote conducted a study that proved emotionally intelligent are more competent and perform better. Therefore, many companies are using "EI training programs" to increase matrix performance.

Disorders
There are a few disorders that show deficiency in emotional expression and response. These include alexithymia, autism, hypomimia and involuntary expression disorder.

Effects 
Expressing emotions can have important effects on individuals’ well-being and relationships with others, depending on how and with whom the emotions are shared. Emotions convey information about our needs, where negative emotions can signal that a need has not been met and positive emotions signal that it has been meet. In some contexts, conveying this information can have a negative impact on an individual; for example, when others ignore or exploit those needs.

Researchers note that there a number of important benefits to expressing emotions selectively. In the case of distress, expression can help people take control of their emotions and facilitate “mean-making” to help them reappraise their situation. For instance, emotional expression through writing can help people better understand their feelings, and subsequently regulate their emotions or adjust their actions. In research by James W. Pennebaker, people who observed a traumatic death showed more improvements in physical health and subjective well-being after writing about their emotions over several days. This research also shows that these benefits only appear when individuals undergo a cognitive change, such as in gaining insight about their experience.

Emotional expression has social implications as well. Since emotions are related to our needs, it is important that they are expressed to others who care about our needs. Expression to someone with whom there is no desire to form a relationship is likely to receive no response. Individuals who express negative emotions, in particular, may also appear less likeable as a result. However, when an individual expresses to someone who responds with empathy, their relationship with that person can improve. Like with writing, hearing another person’s perspective can help people reappraise the situation that incited those emotions. Additionally, emotional expression to someone else can be viewed as a form of disclosure and sign of trust with that person, thus promoting intimacy. For example, greater expression of emotions or willingness to express negative emotions, such as anxiety or fear, promotes the formation of more relationships, greater intimacy in those relationships, and more support from others.

There is evidence that when individuals experience crises and trauma, emotional expression is the coping mechanism that leads to better mental health following the event. This process requires accepting and engaging with the emotional experience in order to reflect on and make sense of them. This can then lead to increases in emotional tolerance, altruism, resilience, psychological flexibility, and community engagement. Furthermore, this process is most effective with done collectively. This research highlights the inherent adaptiveness of these emotional experiences, and the importance of engaging with them.

See also 
Affect display
Affective science
Contrasting and categorization of emotions
Coping
Emotional intelligence
Emotions and culture
Gender and emotional expression
Hypomimia
Sex and emotion

References

Emotion